is a Japanese national university in Akita City, Japan. Established in 1949, it comprises four graduate schools and four undergraduate faculties.

History
Akita University was established in 1949 by the merger of Akita Normal School (established in 1878), Akita Mining College (established in 1910) and the Akita Youth Normal School (established in 1944). The university initially offered degrees in Liberal Arts and Sciences and in Mining Engineering. In 1965, a graduate studies program in mining engineering was established. In 1967, Akita University established a Department of Education, followed in 1970 by a Medical School and University Hospital in 1971. A graduate program in medicine was established in 1976, and a graduate program in Education in 1989. A College of Medical Sciences was also established in 1989.

Organization

Undergraduate
Faculty of International Resource Sciences
Department of Resource Policy and Management
Department of Earth Resource Science
Department of Earth Resource Engineering and Environmental Science
Faculty of Education and Human Studies
Department of School Education
Department of Regional Studies and Humanities
Faculty of Medicine
School of Medicine
School of Health Sciences
Faculty of Engineering Science
Department of Life Science
Life Science Course
Department of Materials Science
Applied Chemistry Course
Materials Science and Engineering Course
Department of Mathematical Science and Electrical-Electron-Computier Engineering
Mathematical Science Course
Electrical and Electronic Engineering Course
Human-Centered Computing Course
Department of Systems Design Engineering
Mechanical Engineering Course
Creative Engineering Course
Civil and Environmental Engineering Course

Graduate
Graduate School of International Resource Sciences
Department of Earth Resource Science (Master's program)
Department of Earth Resource Engineering and Environmental Science (Master's program)
Department of Geosciences, Geotechnology, and Materials Engineering for Resources (PhD program)
Graduate School of Education (Master's program)
Graduate School of Medicine
Medical Science (Master's program)
Medicine (Doctoral program)
Health Science (Doctoral program)
Graduate School of Engineering Science
Department of Life Science (Master's program)
Life Science Course
Department of Materials Science (Master's program)
Applied Chemistry Course
Materials Science and Engineering Course
Department of Mathematical Science and Electrical-Electron-Computer Engineering (Master's program)
Mathematical Science Course
Electrical and Electronic Engineering Course
Human-Centered Computing Course
Department of Systems Design Engineering (Master's program)
Mechanical Engineering Course
Creative Engineering Course
Civil and Environmental Engineering Course
Cooperative Major in Life Cycle Design Engineering (Master's program)
Department of Integrated Engineering Science (PhD program)
Field of Life Science
Field of Materials Science
Field of Mathematical Science and Electrical-Electronic-Computer Engineering
Field of Systems Design Engineering
Source

Akita University Medical FC

 is a Japanese football club based in Akita, the capital city of Akita Prefecture. They play in the Akita Prefecture League. Their team colour is blue.

League record

Honours
Akita Prefecture Soccer League:
Champions: 2012
National University Tournament:
Champions: 2017

References

External links

 

 
Japanese national universities
1949 establishments in Japan
Educational institutions established in 1949
Universities and colleges in Akita Prefecture
Buildings and structures in Akita (city)
Sports teams in Akita Prefecture
Sport in Akita (city)
Football clubs in Japan